Fiorello H. LaGuardia High School of Music & Art and Performing Arts, often referred to simply as LaGuardia, is a public high school specializing in teaching visual arts and performing arts, located near Lincoln Center in the Lincoln Square neighborhood of the Upper West Side in Manhattan, New York City. Located at 100 Amsterdam Avenue between West 64th and 65th Streets, the school is operated by the New York City Department of Education, and resulted from the merger of the High School of Music & Art and the School of Performing Arts. The school has a dual mission of arts and academics, preparing students for a career in the arts or conservatory study as well as a pursuit of higher education.

The school is the only one of New York City's nine specialized high schools to receive special funding from the New York State Legislature through the Hecht-Calandra Act, as well as the only specialized high school that does not use the Specialized High Schools Admissions Test (SHSAT) as admissions criteria.

The school in 2019–2020 had 3,011 students and 164 staff members, with a teacher–student ratio of 1:20.

History
The High School of Music & Art was founded by Mayor Fiorello H. LaGuardia in 1936. He wanted to establish a public school in which students could hone their talents in music, art and the performing arts. In 1948, a similar institution – the High School of Performing Arts – was created in an effort to harness students' talents in dance. The schools merged on paper in 1961 and were to be combined in one building. However, this took many years.

In 1984, the schools moved to a new concrete building, designed by Argentine architect Eduardo Catalano and adjacent to Lincoln Center. The Board of education honored Mayor LaGuardia posthumously by naming the new building after him. Prior to the building's completion in 1985, Music & Art – colloquially known as "The Castle on the Hill" – was located in Manhattan at Convent Avenue and 135th Street in what has since become part of City College of New York's South Campus; the building is home to A. Philip Randolph Campus High School. Performing Arts was located in Midtown Manhattan on West 46th Street. Mayor La Guardia regarded Music & Art as the "most hopeful accomplishment" of his long administration as mayor.

Alumni from LaGuardia and its two legacy schools, High School of Music and Art and School of Performing Arts, are active in supporting the students and the school through scholarships and support for special programs, school events, and reunions held at the school and throughout the world. The school's alumni organization has a full-time executive director and offices at the school. It functions as an independent charitable organization organized under the laws of New York. The prestigious Fame School has built up a reputation as the #1 ranked performing arts high school in NYC.

Academic curriculum
Students at LaGuardia take a full academic course load while participating in conservatory-style arts concentration. Each student majors in one studio, choosing from either Dance, Drama, Art, Vocal Music, Instrumental Music, or Technical Theater. 

Students can take honors classes by choice or programming. LaGuardia also offers several Advanced Placement courses.

Studio curriculum
The school presents an annual musical. The Musical Theater class, an elective school-wide course, is offered through the collaboration of faculty members from Music, Drama, Dance, and the Tech Theater Studios, culminating in a major musical theater performance. Recent productions have included Gypsy, Les Misérables, West Side Story, Hair, Ragtime, Hairspray, Guys and Dolls, Sweet Charity, Grease, In the Heights, Beauty and the Beast, The Sound of Music, and Cinderella.

Art
For the first two years of education, the art department stresses traditional artistic skills and discipline. Students work on drawing from observation, learning color theory, and the principles of design. Following this, students elect vocationally oriented courses in the fine arts such as Digital Media, Architecture, Painting, Sculpture, and Photography. In their senior year, art majors can submit portfolios to the department for consideration for a place in the senior galleries, which are a series of shows organized and constructed by the chosen students and a student curator.

Music
The music department features two symphony orchestras, five choirs, four string ensembles, two concert bands, two jazz bands, a chamber group, a gospel choir, a show choir, and an opera company with a pit orchestra. Vocal and instrumental students study in a conservatory curriculum featuring three hours of music per day, including performing ensembles, electives (in areas such as music technology and composition), music theory and history. The department has done featured work with composers and organizations such as Eric Whitacre, Josh Groban, Arturo O'Farrill, Béla Fleck and NPR's Radiolab.

Instrumental programs
Every student in the instrumental department must join a performing ensemble as well as a class specific to their instrument's musicological classification (one of three winds ensembles, three string orchestras or a percussion corp). After completing their first year with an ensemble, students may fulfill the remainder of performance credits with electives.
The LaGuardia Symphony Orchestra ("Junior Orchestra") was formed with the goal of exposing students to more complex and professional repertoire.
The LaGuardia Philharmonic ("Senior Orchestra") accepts students through a rigorous secondary audition process. It is one of LaGuardia's best known ensembles.
Junior Jazz teaches elementary jazz performance and theory.
Senior Jazz is the school's premier, award-winning jazz band.
Chamber Ensemble
Symphonic Winds ("Junior Band") was formed as an alternative to the orchestral program, exposing wind, brass and percussion students to repertoire that features their instruments.
Winds Symphony ("Senior Band") also necessitates a secondary audition process, and is slowly moving towards work with professional musicians and recording studios.
Pit Orchestra, a program consisting of two distinct ensembles that perform with the annual musical and opera. In 2014, the musical pit orchestra worked with Lin-Manuel Miranda and the cast of In The Heights to help workshop their own production of the musical.

Vocal programs
Every student in the vocal department must perform with Elementary Chorus within their first or second year. At the secondary level, students must perform with either Mixed Chorus or Girls' Chorus. Third-year vocal music majors must complete an additional year of chorus, performing either with Mixed Chorus, Women's Chorus, or Senior Chorus. 
Women's Chorus is an all-female group that is open to third- and fourth-year voice students. It is not audition-based.
Senior Chorus is a competitive elective class open to juniors and seniors. The ensemble is one of LaGuardia's most well known and has been routinely selected to perform for the American Choral Directors Association. 
Gospel Chorus is an elective open to all students. 
Show Choir is also an elective course that accepts students from any studio. 
Opera Workshop is open to third- and fourth-year vocal majors through audition, where operatic works are analyzed and studied. The opera of choice is performed halfway through the spring semester. In 2011, the Broadway musical team of Laurence O'Keefe and Nell Benjamin announced a musical with LaGuardia's Opera Workshop and Pit Orchestra. The musical, entitled Life of the Party, is a comedy based on Stalinist movie musicals of the Soviet Union. The work ran from May 3 through May 6, 2012.
Solo Voice teaches operatic solos through private instruction.

Musicology programs
Every music student must pass an elementary sight singing course as well as a year of music theory and history in order to graduate. 
The LaGuardia New Music Ensemble focuses on popular music composition and theory. Students are able to compose their own original songs and perform them during school productions. The ensemble grants admission through auditions, in which a portfolio is required.
Music Technology is a class in music production, electronic music history and computer theory.
Composition is taught through private instruction, currently with composer Jim Pugliese.

Drama
There are several guest teachers in the drama department, who are featured particularly in the junior and senior courses. Jake Gyllenhaal, Alan Rickman and Darren Criss have visited to speak with students, and recent graduates Timothée Chalamet and Ansel Elgort have also returned. Rapper Nicki Minaj is also a drama department graduate. The faculty members of the department include AP Sandy Faison, Harry Shifman, Lee Lobenhoffer and Robert Krausz. Actress Ally Sheedy teaches at the school full time.

Dance
The Dance Department is based strictly on pre-conservatory-based training in the field of dance. Students spend the first two years training solely in classical ballet and the combined modern techniques of Graham and Horton. In their junior year they are given the opportunity to take musical theater and tap classes.  Beyond that, the junior class performs for the first time junior year.  The second semester of junior year they take a choreography class in which they create pieces of their own to perform.  Senior year, the dancers take career management classes to support their success and take part in two performances: the Winter Showcase and the Graduation Dance Concert of the spring.

Alumni of the program include Desmond Richardson and Suzanne Vega.

Technical theater
The Technical Theater Studio is a professional training program that provides students with the skills and techniques necessary to pursue a career in technical theater.  Concepts and aesthetics are taught using contemporary teaching methods that utilize state-of-the-art equipment. Professionally produced events in the concert hall, thrust-stage theater, and black-box theater provide students with practical hands-on work experiences.

Sports
LaGuardia offers 21 different sports on the Varsity level. LaGuardia competes with the Public School Athletic League (PSAL).

Fall season sports
Fall season sports include bowling, swimming, volleyball, cross country (girls'), fencing (co-ed), soccer, and cross country (boys').

Winter season sports
Winter season sports include basketball, gymnastics, and indoor track (boys' and girls'). In the spring, the school offers baseball, outdoor track, tennis, volleyball (boys'), handball, softball and tennis (girls').

Representation in other media
The 1980 dramatic film Fame was based on student life at the School of Performing Arts prior to its merger into LaGuardia High School. A television series based on the film, Fame, was launched in 1982. It was adapted again as a stage musical, which premiered in 1988. A loose remake of the film was released in 2009.

Drugs and mental health issues 
The use of illegal substances is very prevalent in Laguardia High School. The school has documented issues with heavy drugs such as opioids and other pharmaceuticals. Mental health is also a very big issue at the school. This paired with homework and practicing talents as well as other obligations has taken a toll on the mental health of the student body, especially in recent years. This is evident in the NYCDOE's school snapshot surveys which reveal that 81% of students say they experienced stress while learning at Laguardia High School. Additionally, in the 2019–2020 NYCDOE surveys, only 46% of students reported that their teachers support them when they're upset.

See also

 List of Fiorello H. LaGuardia High School alumni
 Professional Children's School
 Professional Performing Arts School
 School of American Ballet
 Special Music School

References

External links

 

1936 establishments in New York City
Art schools in New York City
Educational institutions established in 1936
Gifted education
Lincoln Square, Manhattan
Public high schools in Manhattan
Schools of the performing arts in the United States
Specialized high schools in New York City
Music schools in New York City